The molecular formula C16H19BrN2 (molar mass: 319.24 g/mol, exact mass: 318.0732 u) may refer to:

 Brompheniramine
 Dexbrompheniramine

Molecular formulas